The 2018 United States House of Representatives elections in West Virginia were held on November 6, 2018, to elect the three U.S. representatives from the West Virginia, one from each of the state's three congressional districts. The filing deadline was January 27, 2018. The primary elections were held on May 8, 2018. The elections coincided with the other elections to the House of Representatives, elections to the United States Senate and various state and local elections.

The 2018 elections resulted in no change in partisan representation, with the Republican incumbents in Districts 1 and 2 winning re-election, and the Republicans holding the open-seat election in District 3, leaving the House delegation at 3-0 Republican.

Overview

By district
Results of the 2018 United States House of Representatives elections in West Virginia by district:

District 1

Republican incumbent David McKinley had represented the district since 2011. In 2016, he was reelected with 68.97% of the vote. McKinley successfully ran for re-election.

Democratic primary
 Ralph Baxter, former chairman and CEO of the law firm Orrick, Herrington & Sutcliffe
 Kendra Fershee, West Virginia University law professor 
Tom Payne, attorney

Primary results

Republican primary
 David McKinley, incumbent

Primary results

General election

Polling

Results

District 2

Republican incumbent Alex Mooney had represented the district since 2015. In 2016, he was reelected with 58.18% of the vote. Mooney successfully ran for reelection. West Virginia's 2nd district had been included on the initial list of Republican held seats being targeted by the Democratic Congressional Campaign Committee in 2018.

Democratic primary
 Aaron Scheinberg, veteran and former director of The Mission Continues
 Talley Sergent, former U.S. State Department official and West Virginia state director for Hillary Clinton's presidential campaign in 2016.

Endorsements

Primary results

Republican primary
 Alex Mooney, incumbent

Primary results

General election

Endorsements

Polling

Results

District 3

Republican incumbent Evan Jenkins had represented the district since 2015. In 2016, he was reelected with 67.88% of the vote. Jenkins vacated the seat to run for Senate against Democratic incumbent Joe Manchin. Resigned September 30, 2018, to become justice of the Supreme Court of Appeals of West Virginia.

Democratic primary
 Paul Davis, CEO of the Tri-State Transit Authority
 Janice "Byrd" Hagerman
Shirley Love, state delegate for District 32
 Richard Ojeda, state senator

Primary results

Republican primary
 Ayne Amjad, physician
 Marty Gearheart, state delegate
Conrad Lucas, chairman of the West Virginia Republican Party and candidate for West Virginia's 3rd congressional district in 2010
 Carol Miller, Majority Whip of the West Virginia House of Delegates
 Philip Payton
 Rupert Phillips, state delegate
 Rick Snuffer, state delegate

Primary results

General election

Endorsements

Predictions

Polling

Results

References

External links
Candidates at Vote Smart 
Candidates at Ballotpedia 
Campaign finance at FEC 
Campaign finance at OpenSecrets

Official campaign websites for first district candidates
Kendra Fershee (D) for Congress
David McKinley (R) for Congress

Official campaign websites for second district candidates
Alex Mooney (R) for Congress
Talley Sergent (D) for Congress

Official campaign websites for third district candidates
Carol Miller (R) for Congress
Richard Ojeda (D) for Congress

2018
West Virginia
United States House of Representatives